Achra is located at Madhupur Upazila in Tangail of Bangladesh.
Achra Bangladesh @ Google Maps

See also
Achra, India

Populated places in Dhaka Division